Maslama or Maslamah (Arabic: مَسْلَمة maslamah) is an Arabic male given name and sometimes female, meaning "peace, safety and security from every calamity, disease, evil, misfortune, ordeal, pestilence, damage, harm, disaster, injury, affliction", "conciliate, re-conciliate, peacemaking, compromise", "guiltless, ingenuous, innocent, naive, simple", "compliant, flexible, obedient, god-fearing, submissive (pious), acceptance" and "deliverance, rescue, salvation".

The name Maslama stems from the male noun-name Salaam.

Maslama or Maslamah can refer to:

 Maslama ibn Mukhallad al-Ansari (616/620 – 682), companion of Muhammad and governor of Egypt
 Maslama ibn Habib (died 632), better known as Musaylimah, "false Prophet" at the time of Muhammad
 Maslama ibn Abd al-Malik (died 738), Umayyad prince and general against the Byzantines and Khazars
 Maslama ibn Hisham, Umayyad prince, son of Caliph Hisham
 Maslama ibn Yahya al-Bajali, governor of Egypt in 789
 Maslama al-Majriti (died 1007/8), Muslim scholar, astronomer and mathematician from al-Andalus